Marko Nikolić (born 17 September 1997) is a Swedish footballer who plays for Jönköpings Södra in Superettan as a attacking midfielder.

Career
He made his debut in Allsvenskan for AIK 7 July 2014 as a 16-year-old against Åtvidabergs FF. After 3 years in AIK he signed a 6 month contract with K.V.C. Westerlo, but due to the injury he played only one match. After a short episode in K.V.C. Westerlo, he played two seasons for IF Brommapojkarna. Nikolic left IF Brommapojkarna at the end of 2018.

In February 2019, Nikolić signed for Vasalunds IF. In January 2021, Nikolić moved to Jönköpings Södra, where he signed a three-year contract.

References

External links

AIK profile

1997 births
Living people
People from Huddinge Municipality
Swedish people of Serbian descent
Serb diaspora sportspeople
Swedish footballers
Association football forwards
AIK Fotboll players
Syrianska FC players
K.V.C. Westerlo players
IF Brommapojkarna players
Vasalunds IF players
Jönköpings Södra IF players
Allsvenskan players
Superettan players
Ettan Fotboll players
Belgian Pro League players
Sweden youth international footballers
Swedish expatriate footballers
Swedish expatriate sportspeople in Belgium
Expatriate footballers in Belgium
Sportspeople from Stockholm County